Medium is an American supernatural drama television series created by Glenn Gordon Caron that originally aired on NBC for five seasons from January 3, 2005 to June 1, 2009, and on CBS for two more seasons from September 25, 2009 to January 21, 2011.

The series stars Patricia Arquette as Allison DuBois, a medium employed as a consultant for the Phoenix, Arizona, district attorney's office, in fictional "Mariposa County" (Phoenix is actually in Maricopa County). Allison and her husband Joe (Jake Weber) are the parents of three daughters (Sofia Vassilieva, Feodor Lark, and Madison and Miranda Carabello), all of whom inherited Allison's gift. The show was initially based on the experiences of medium Allison DuBois, who claims she has worked with law enforcement agencies across the country in criminal investigations.

Medium was created by Glenn Gordon Caron and was produced by his company Picturemaker Productions and Kelsey Grammer's Grammnet Productions in association with Paramount Network Television from 2005 to 2006, CBS Paramount Network Television from 2006 to 2009 (after the split of Viacom and CBS Corporation), and finally CBS Television Studios from 2009 until the series ended.

The production division of CBS had assumed production of Medium in 2006 after absorbing the television arm of the Paramount Pictures film studio. Paramount's home entertainment arm still held DVD distribution rights in conjunction with CBS DVD. On November 18, 2010, CBS announced that the show had been canceled after seven seasons. The series finale aired on January 21, 2011.

Episodes 

Allison DuBois (Patricia Arquette), a mother of three, has the gift of being able to talk to dead people, as well as foresee events and witness past events in her dreams. When she begins working for Phoenix District Attorney Manuel Devalos (Miguel Sandoval) as an intern, she has a dream related to a murder in Texas, the successful solving of which convinces Devalos and others working in the D.A.'s office – as well as herself and her husband Joe (Jake Weber) – that her gift is real.

One challenge is convincing Devalos — and other doubters in the criminal justice system — that her psychic abilities can give them the upper hand when it comes to solving crimes. Information comes to her in dreams or in cryptic visions that sometimes do not mean what they initially suggest. The other is convincing Joe that her nightmares are visions based in reality and that she's not simply neurotic.

In police investigations, Allison often accompanies Det. Lee Scanlon (David Cubitt), who initially did not believe in her gift. Allison sometimes bends the rules when she is determined to stop a crime about which she has had a vision. Additionally, Allison has helped and been helped by crochety, phlegmatic Captain Kenneth Push of the Texas Rangers (Arliss Howard), the first law-enforcement person to whom Allison revealed her gift, and, later, Cynthia Keener (Anjelica Huston) of AmeriTips, a nationwide private detective agency. In season four, it was revealed that Cynthia had a missing daughter. Allison's dreams showed that Cynthia's daughter was dead. Cynthia made a choice to kill the murderer of her daughter and go to prison. Cynthia later appeared in season five to help Allison on a case. Also during this season, it was revealed that Lynn DiNovi (Tina DiJoseph), Lee's live-in lover and an assistant to the Mayor of Phoenix, had become pregnant with Lee's child. In the season five finale, Allison discovers that she has a tumor on her brainstem. To prevent the brutal murders of her family in the future, Allison risked her life as she postponed the critical surgery fearing it would prevent her from solving the case. During her operation the tumor was successfully removed, except for a small piece deeply embedded in her brainstem, Joe is told that Allison is in a coma and may not survive.

In the sixth-season premiere episode, Allison awoke from the coma and was suffering the consequences of postponing the surgery. Allison's psychic abilities slowly begin to resurface as a form of déjà vu. At the end of the episode, Allison slowly recovers her abilities.

Since the season six premiere, eldest daughter Ariel (Sofia Vassilieva) has taken the role of nurturing her siblings, Bridgette and Marie, and is feeling overwhelmed. Ariel falls victim to a body possession by a vengeance-seeking spirit but is rescued, with her mother's help. After her surgery, Allison gets back to her normal routine working alongside Devalos and Lee, with possible side effects of her surgery affecting her dreams. Lee proposes to his girlfriend, Lynn.

As the season progresses, Ariel's transformation from a young girl into a mature woman was shown in the episode "Time Keeps on Slippin'", where she solves a crime in the future. In the season finale, Allison receives a letter from her neurologist about her brain tumor. Meanwhile, Ariel receives an acceptance letter from a university away from home. The episode begins when Joe awakens to Allison dead in their bed, having died from her tumor during the night. As the family mourns her death, Allison contacts Ariel from the other side, asking her to do one last thing for her before she passes on. However, Ariel decides to follow her own path. She turns to alcohol and leaves Phoenix without telling anyone. Suddenly, Allison awakens in her bed alive, the same morning Joe found her dead. At the end of the episode, Allison, Joe, Ariel, and Devalos and his wife Lily, are seen celebrating Lynn and Lee's wedding, toasting the engaged couples' bright futures.

In the seventh and final season, a division is created between Allison and Joe because of their desired career paths. At work, Manuel wants to run for Mayor but fears the publicity of his daughter's suicide will be used against his family; however, Lily agrees to help him campaign. Allison wishes to go back to law school because she may lose her job if Manuel is elected. Meanwhile, Joe wants to obtain an MBA, but they cannot afford for both of them to attend school. Despite Allison's wishes, Joe enrolls in school, not knowing that Allison has done the same.

In the episode "Native Tongue" Allison cannot understand anything anyone says to her, testing Joe's patience. At the end of the episode, the two reconcile, but Joe's unhappiness is still evident. Ariel leaves for college. The spirit of Lee Scanlon's deceased evil brother comes to try to entice his "baby brother" into wrongdoing. Scanlon's ensuing actions nearly end his relationship with Allison. In the episode "Blood on the Tracks", Joe's mother Marjorie is diagnosed with brain cancer.

When Joe sees his mother in the hospital, she tells him she knows nothing will happen because Allison, in season four's "Burn Baby Burn", had, to comfort the older woman, lied about Marjorie being around at her granddaughter's wedding. Marjorie accepts her fate and dies. That same night, Allison and the kids join Joe in Michigan, who is staying at his mother's home. In the early morning hours, Allison is visited by Marjorie's spirit, which warns her of upcoming "darkness" in her life. Before she can elaborate, Joe enters the room and Marjorie disappears, leaving Allison very concerned.

In the series finale, Allison receives a phone call from Joe in the midst of a plane crash that leaves no survivors. The episode cuts to seven years later, at which time Allison is an attorney building a case against a Mexican drug dealer. Allison and Marie, now a teenager, live alone. Marie cannot forgive her father for never visiting them as a ghost, something that has plagued Allison all these years. Through her dreams, Allison ostensibly sees that Joe never died, but washed up on the coast of Mexico with amnesia. A crooked cop had concealed Joe's past and was using him as an unsuspecting drug mule to transport narcotics. Against Devalos' orders, Allison strikes a deal with the drug dealer to learn Joe's location. The two are reunited, but at this point Allison wakes up in the present to see Joe's ghost. He informs her that his plane's engine failed after it departed Hawaii and that no one survived the crash. Joe sent Allison a dream of her life seven years in the future to show her that she could live an enriching, independent life.

However, Allison's love for Joe overpowered the original vision and crafted an alternate reality in which she found Joe alive. Joe's ghost leaves as Allison sobs, unable to accept her husband's death. The episode cuts to 41 years later, showcasing photos of the life that Allison has had. As Allison listens to a voice mail from her great-granddaughter, she slumps in her chair. In death, she is reunited with Joe, who has waited for her, and they kiss.

Family
All of Allison's daughters appear to have inherited her gift.  Ariel and Bridgette have visions or dreams, which usually occur when their mother is searching for answers to her own dreams.

In season one, Bridgette plays with a boy on her school playground who no one else sees. He is the ghost of a child who died several years earlier. Several years later she is coached to be a soccer goalie by a deceased school coach.

In the third season, Marie also begins to exhibit paranormal abilities. She has been shown viewing a premium TV channel that the family does not subscribe to, reading the mind of her optometrist to pass her eye exam, and unknowingly using paper dolls to predict the future of her father's company. In the fifth season, Marie has her first psychic dream, where she sees herself on stage with stage fright during a school play. In earlier seasons, Bridgette appears not to be bothered by her abilities, but during the fourth season she has moments of frustration when trying to understand her visions or communicate them to her parents. Ariel has a harder time coping with her developing gifts.

The second-season episode, "Sweet Child O'Mine", reveals that Allison and Joe lost their first child, a boy they planned to name Brian (played by Noel Fisher). Around the anniversary of his loss each year, Allison has dreams of a life where Brian had grown up as a part of the family, though often in these dreams he dies in front of her.

Allison's younger half-brother, Michael (nicknamed "Lucky"), has the family gift, too, but does not like to acknowledge it.

Initially, Allison believed the gift had skipped a generation and her mother had had no psychic abilities. However, she later discovers that her mother had always possessed the gift but had repressed it.

Cast and characters

Reception

Ratings and broadcasts 
The series premiere received 16.13 million viewers and a 6.3 rating in the 18–49 demo against CSI: Miami'''s 18.17 million and 6.6 rating. Medium was a consistent performer throughout its first season and landed in the Nielsen Top 20 with an average of 13.9 million viewers. The series remained in its original time slot for the second season when the network announced its Fall 2005 schedule. Throughout the season, the series experienced a decline in viewership, pulling an average of 11 million viewers. Medium was renewed for a third season in April 2006, but was missing from NBC's Fall 2006 schedule. The series was slated to return in early 2007; however, in October it was announced that production would resume immediately for a third season start-up on November 15, 2006, replacing the time slot vacated by Kidnapped. Its move to the Wednesday time slot opposite CBS' CSI: NY and ABC's Lost led to some ratings erosion, in comparison to the ratings success of the first two seasons, with year-end ratings for the third season dipping into single-digit millions of viewers. Despite the ratings decline on Wednesdays, the series was seen by the network as a reliable self-starter, building on its then lead-in Crossing Jordan. The ratings decline put the series on the bubble for renewal, but the series showed signs of life when NBC requested six additional scripts in April 2007.

Renewal for a fourth season of Medium was announced on May 7, 2007, with an undetermined premiere date and number of episodes. It was the seventh series to be renewed by the network, behind solid performers Heroes and Law & Order: Special Victims Unit. One week later, the network announced that Medium would move to the Sunday 9 p.m. time slot upon its return in January 2008. News on the series' return did not come until December 2007 when NBC announced that the fourth season would begin in January in its original Monday 10 p.m. time slot, despite the WGA Strike of 2007, which forced the show to cease production, allowing for only nine segments/episodes to be filmed. Scheduling returning mid-season shows in timeslots where they were previously successful was a pattern for NBC during the strike: Law & Order returned to Wednesdays at 10 and The Apprentice was back on Thursdays at 9:00 p.m.

With the ratings improvement Medium demonstrated in its fourth season after returning to Mondays, it was one of the first series to be renewed in an early announcement in April 2008 from NBC regarding its 2008–09 season. Similar to the previous season, Medium was initially scheduled to move to the Sunday night line-up; however, a December 2008 press release revealed that the fifth season would air in the series' original Monday night 10 p.m. time slot.

After some ratings erosion during its fifth season, NBC renewed Medium for an abridged sixth season in early May 2009. However, within a week negotiations stalled over episode count and subsequently NBC decided not to renew the series despite the fact that it outperformed some of the network's renewed shows. Within 24 hours of NBC's cancellation, CBS, whose production arm produces the series, renewed the show for a full, 22-episode, sixth season, placing it in the Friday at 9:00 p.m. slot between fellow CBS in-house productions Ghost Whisperer (which had a similar theme to Medium) and Numb3rs. CBS first aired this series with a rerun episode on July 21, 2009. The sixth season premiered on Friday, September 25, 2009 at 9pm. Throughout its sixth season, Medium and its lead-in Ghost Whisperer won their respective time slots on most Fridays, and each show took turns being the most-watched show of the night. As the season drew to a close, Ghost Whisperer was considered a definite renewal, whereas Medium was once again on the bubble for renewal. However, in a dramatic move from CBS, the network announced on May 18, 2010, that Medium was renewed for a seventh season, while seven other series, including Ghost Whisperer, were canceled by the network.  TVbytheNumbers.com speculated that the decision was made because Medium is fully owned by CBS, while Ghost Whisperer was split between CBS and ABC.  Upon its return in September 2010, Medium took over the Friday 8 p.m. slot vacated by Ghost Whisperer.

 Cancellation 
On October 26, 2010, CBS ordered the seventh and final season cut from 22 to 13 episodes. On November 15, 2010, Patricia Arquette told Entertainment Weekly that the show "got canceled" and had only two more episodes to shoot. She also said the writers were excited that they would be able to end the show properly. On November 18, 2010, series creator Glenn Gordon Caron posted to both the Medium Facebook page and the CBS forums, stating that the show had been canceled and that the series finale would be broadcast on January 21, 2011. CBS confirmed the cancellation with a press release on December 21, 2010, which also confirmed the series finale date of January 21.

 Seasonal ratings/broadcast history 
Seasonal rankings (based on average total viewers per episode) of Medium.

Each U.S. network television season generally starts in late September and ends in late May (except for the fifth season), which coincides with the completion of May sweeps. Times mentioned in this section are in Eastern Time.

 Awards and nominations 

Home media
CBS DVD (distributed by Paramount) has released all 7 seasons of Medium'' on DVD in Regions 1, 2 & 4.

See also
 List of ghost films

Further reading

References

External links 
 
 

2005 American television series debuts
2011 American television series endings
2000s American crime drama television series
2000s American mystery television series
2000s American supernatural television series
2010s American crime drama television series
2010s American mystery television series
2010s American supernatural television series
CBS original programming
English-language television shows
NBC original programming
Television shows about psychic powers
Television series by CBS Studios
American television series revived after cancellation
Television shows set in Los Angeles
Television shows set in Phoenix, Arizona
Television series about ghosts